Yumbarra Conservation Park, formerly the Yumbarra National Park, is a protected area in the Australian state of South Australia located about  north of the town centre of Ceduna.

To the north it borders Yellabinna Regional Reserve; to the east, Pureba Conservation Park. The conservation park is outside the dog fence, which borders it in the south. Thus, it is situated in the area where dingoes are tolerated. Other animals in the conservation park include southern hairy-nosed wombats, malleefowls, sandhill dunnarts and kangaroos.

The name 'Yumbarra' comes from a protruding rock hole in the area. When it rains, the rock fills with water, turning into a temporary water hole for the conservation park's wildlife. This particular feature of the rock makes it an important site for birds, and thus bird watching.

The arid landscape is characterized by rolling sand dunes. A few walking trails follow the Googs Track.

The conservation park is an important habitat for some of Australia's most endangered wildlife species, such as the malleefowl and sandhill dunnart. The conservation park is also home to kangaroos, wombats and dingoes.

A co-management agreement signed by the Far West Coast Aboriginal Corporation and the Government of South Australia in 2013 in respect to the Yumbarra Conservation Park provides for the corporation to give advice on the management of the conservation park and other reserves in the west of the state.

The conservation park is classified as an IUCN IUCN Category VI protected area.

See also
 Protected areas of South Australia

References

External links
Yumbarra Conservation Park official webpage
the Yumbarra Conservation Park webpage on the Protected Planet website

Conservation parks of South Australia
Protected areas established in 1968
1968 establishments in Australia
Co-managed protected areas in South Australia
Great Victoria Desert